This is an incomplete list of Statutory Instruments of the United Kingdom in 1960. This listing includes the complete, 45 items, "Partial Dataset" as listed on www.legislation.gov.uk (as at March 2014).

Statutory Instruments
The Coal and Other Mines (Shafts, Outlets and Roads) Regulations, 1960 SI 1960/69
The Plant and Machinery (Rating) Order, 1960 SI 1960/122
The Opencast Coal (Fees) Regulations, 1960 SI 1960/194
The Family Allowances, National Insurance and Industrial Injuries (Denmark) Order 1960 SI 1960/211
The Cycle Racing on Highways Regulations, 1960 SI 1960/250
The Cycle Racing on Highways (Scotland) Regulations, 1960 SI 1960/270
The Western European Union (Immunities and Privileges) Order 1960 SI 1960/444
The Election Petition Rules, 1960 SI 1960/543
The Whaling Industry (Ship) (Amendment) Regulations, 1960 SI 1960/547
The Diving Operations Special Regulations, 1960 SI 1960/688
The Post-War Credit (Income Tax) Amendment Regulations, 1960 SI 1960/769
The British Transport Commission (Male Wages Grades Pensions) (Amendment) Regulations, 1960 SI 1960/784
The Foreign Compensation (Czechoslovakia) (Registration) Order, 1960 SI 1960/ 849
The Coal Mines (Firedamp Drainage) Regulations, 1960 SI 1960/1015
The Visiting Forces (Royal Australian Air Force) Order, 1960 SI 1960/1053
The Visiting Forces Act (Application to Colonies) (Amendment) Order, 1960 SI 1960/1061
The National Insurance (Non-participation-Benefits and Schemes) Amendment Regulations, 1960 SI 1960/1104
The Coal and Other Mines (Ventilation) (Variation) Regulations, 1960 SI 1960/1116
The Traffic Signs (Speed Limits) Regulations 1960 S.I. 1960/1124
The Mental Health Review Tribunal Rules, 1960 SI 1960/1139
The National Insurance (Pensions, Existing Contributors) (Transitional) Amendment Regulations, 1960 SI 1960/1226
The Sovereign Base Areas of Akrotiri and Dhekelia Order in Council, 1960 SI 1960/1369
The International Development Association Order, 1960 SI 1960/1383
The Caravan Sites (Licence Applications) Order, 1960 SI 1960/1474
The Merchant Shipping (Certificates of Competency as A.B.) (Mauritius) Order, 1960 SI 1960/1662
The Merchant Shipping (Certificates of Competency as A.B.) (Trinidad and Tobago) Order, 1960 SI 1960/1663
The Tuberculosis (England and Wales Attested Area) Order, 1960 SI 1960/1708
The National Insurance (Non-participation-Local Government Staffs) Regulations, 1960 SI 1960/1725
The British Wool Marketing Scheme (Directions) Amendment Order, 1960 SI 1960/1726
The Coal Mines (Precautions against Inflammable Dust) (Variation) Regulations, 1960 SI 1960/1738
The Shipbuilding and Ship-repairing Regulations, 1960 SI 1960/1932
The Visiting Forces (Canadian Military and Air Forces) Order, 1960 SI 1960/1956
The Merchant Shipping (Confirmation of Legislation) (Sarawak) Order, 1960 SI 1960/1963
The Trustee Savings Banks Life Annuity (Amendment) Regulations, 1960 SI 1960/1985
The Dock Workers (Regulation of Employment) (Amendment) Order, 1960 SI 1960/2029
The National Insurance (Non-participation-Fire Services) Regulations, 1960 SI 1960/2185
The British Nationality (Cyprus) Order 1960 SI 1960/2215
The Merchant Shipping (Registration of Scottish Fishery Cruisers, Research Ships etc.) Order 1960 SI 1960/2217
The Arsenic in Food (Amendment) Regulations 1960 SI 1960/2261
The National Insurance (Non-participation-Police) Regulations, 1960 SI 1960/2288
The Bills of Sale (Local Registration) Rules 1960 SI 1960/2326 (L. 21)
The Census of Distribution (1962) (Restriction on Disclosure) Order, 1960 SI 1960/2364
The Charities (Exception of Voluntary Schools from Registration) Regulations, 1960 SI 1960/2366
The Merchant Shipping (Confirmation of Legislation) (North Borneo) Order, 1960 SI 1960/2413
The Double Taxation Relief (Air Transport Profits) (Iran) Order 1960 SI 1960/2419
The Tithe (Copies of Instruments of Apportionment) Rules, 1960 SI 1960/2440

Unreferenced Listings
The following 19 items were previously listed on this article, however are unreferenced on the authorities site, included here for a "no loss" approach.
Heights Mine (Storage Battery Locomotives) Special Regulations 1960 SI 1960/223
The Parliamentary Constituencies (Scotland) (Midlothian, Edinburgh East, Edinburgh South, Edinburgh West and Edinburgh Pentlands) Order 1960 SI 1960/468
The Parliamentary Constituencies (Scotland) (West Fife and Dunfermline Burghs) Order 1960 SI 1960/469
The Parliamentary Constituencies (Scotland) (West Renfrewshire and Greenock) Order 1960 SI 1960/470
Don Valley Water Board Order 1960 SI 1960/624
Barnsley Corporation (Water Charges) Order 1960 SI 1960/641
British Seamen's Cards Order 1960 SI 1960/967
Washing Facilities (Running Water) Exemption Regulations 1960 SI 1960/1029
Barnsley Water Order 1960 SI 1960/1195
Washing Facilities (Miscellaneous Industries) Regulations 1960 SI 1960/1214
Federal Republic of Germany (Extradition) Order 1960 SI 1960/1375
Mid-Wessex Water Order 1960 SI 1960/1553
Israel (Extradition) Order 1960 SI 1960/1660
Betting (Licensing) Regulations 1960 SI 1960/1701
Factories (Cleanliness of Walls and Ceilings) Order 1960 SI 1960/1794
Post Office Register (Trustee Savings Banks) (Amendment) Regulations 1960 SI 1960/1984
Legal Aid (Scotland) (General) Regulations 1960 SI 1960/2195
Act of Sederunt (Legal Aid Rules Amendment) 1960 SI 1960/2269

References

External links
Legislation.gov.uk delivered by the UK National Archive
UK SI's on legislation.gov.uk
UK Draft SI's on legislation.gov.uk

See also
List of Statutory Instruments of the United Kingdom

Lists of Statutory Instruments of the United Kingdom
Statutory Instruments